Horden & Peterlee Rugby Football Club is an English rugby union club who play in the Durham/Northumberland 1.

History

Horden & Peterlee Rugby Football Club was formed in 1925.
 Official Club History

Club Structure

Horden and Peterlee have four senior teams within the club.

 1st Team
 2nd Team (Harlequins)
 3rd Team (Spartans)
 Ladies Team (Valkyries)

Current squad

Mini & Junior

Horden have a very successful mini & junior set up with teams from U8 > U18.
February 2012, saw Horden have their U13s, U16s and U18s all in the respective County Cup semi-finals for the 2011/12 season.
Horden now have successful U15's and U18's girls teams.

A number of players from Horden have gone on to represent Durham County and the club currently has a number of players at the regional school of rugby.

Rivals

In recent years, Horden's main rivals have been Hartlepool Rovers. West Hartlepool are the other main local derby.

Club Honours
 Durham/Northumberland 1 champions (4): 1991–92, 2001–02, 2005–06, 2013–14
 North East 2 Champions (1): 1993–94

References

External links
 [www.pitchero.com/clubs/hordenrugbyclub - Official Club Website]

English rugby union teams
Rugby clubs established in 1925
Rugby union in County Durham
1925 establishments in England